The New American (TNA) is a conservative and right-wing print magazine published twice a month and a digital news source published daily online by American Opinion Publishing Inc., a wholly owned subsidiary of the John Birch Society. The magazine was created in 1985 from the merger of two JBS publications: American Opinion and The Review of the News.

History
In February 1956, before his foundation of the John Birch Society over two years later, Robert W. Welch Jr. created his first publication, a monthly entitled One Man's Opinion, which became known two years later as American Opinion. Additionally, in 1965, he established a JBS-affiliated publication known as The Review of the News, which was intended for a larger readership and covered news. 

In September 1985, American Opinion was merged with The Review of the News to create The New American, with the aim of attracting a readership large enough to "make the saving of our country possible." The magazine's name was inspired by Robert Welch's "New Americanism" essay.  It was first headquartered in Belmont, Massachusetts.

In 2006, TNA launched a mobile edition. In 2007, TNA published a special issue devoted to opposing a North American Union; approximately 500,000 copies were distributed.

In September 2019, during the Trump–Ukraine scandal, Hunter Biden's Wikipedia article included dubious claims about his business dealings in Ukraine and his father Joe Biden's motivations for going after a Ukrainian prosecutor; the claims were sourced to The Epoch Times and The New American. 

TNA has described what it sees as American moral decline and threats to the family, including abortion, drugs, homosexuality, crime, violence, teenage pregnancy, teen suicide, feminism, and pornography. 

Contributors have included Hilaire du Berrier, Samuel Blumenfeld, Larry McDonald, and Ron Paul.

References

External links
 
American Opinion book list (1968)

1985 establishments in the United States
Bimonthly magazines published in the United States
Conspiracist media
John Birch Society
Magazines established in 1985
Magazines published in Boston
Magazines published in Wisconsin
Conservative magazines published in the United States